Bryan Jones may refer to:

Bryan Jones (cricketer) (born 1961), English cricketer
Bryan Jones Anicézio (born 1990), Brazilian soccer player
Sewell Jones (Bryan Sewell Watson Jones, 1897–1981), American football coach
Bryan D. Jones, political scientist 
The R.O.C. (rapper), born Bryan Jones, rapper
SL Jones, born Bryan Jones, American rapper and songwriter
Mr. Pookie, born Bryan Jones, rapper
Bryan Jones, frontman of Jerry's Kids

See also
Brian Jones (disambiguation)